Loie Fuller (born Marie Louise Fuller; January 15, 1862 – January 1, 1928), also known as Louie Fuller and Loïe Fuller, was an American actress and dancer who was a pioneer of both modern dance and theatrical lighting techniques.

Career
Born Marie Louise Fuller in the Chicago suburb of Fullersburg, Illinois,  now Hinsdale, Illinois, Fuller began her theatrical career as a professional child actress and later choreographed and performed dances in burlesque (as a skirt dancer), vaudeville, and circus shows. Her debut took place when she was four years. An early free dance practitioner, Fuller developed her own natural movement and improvisation techniques. In multiple shows she experimented with a long skirt, choreographing its movements and playing with the ways it could reflect light. By 1891, Fuller combined her choreography with silk costumes illuminated by multi-coloured lighting of her own design, and created the Serpentine Dance. After much difficulty finding someone willing to produce her work when she was primarily known as an actress, she was finally hired to perform her piece between acts of a comedy entitled Uncle Celestine, and received rave reviews.

Almost immediately, she was replaced by imitators (originally Minnie "Renwood" Bemis). In the hope of receiving serious artistic recognition that she was not getting in America, Fuller left for Europe in June 1892. She became one of the first of many American modern dancers who traveled to Europe to seek recognition. Her warm reception in Paris persuaded Fuller to remain in France, where she became one of the leading revolutionaries in the arts. A regular performer at the Folies Bergère with works such as Fire Dance, Fuller became the embodiment of the Art Nouveau movement and was often identified with symbolism, as her work was seen as the perfect reciprocity between idea and symbol. Fuller began adapting and expanding her costume and lighting, so that they became the principal element in her performance—perhaps even more important than the actual choreography, especially as the length of the skirt was increased and became the central focus, while the body became mostly hidden within the depths of the fabric.  An 1896 film of the Serpentine Dance by the pioneering film-makers Auguste and Louis Lumière gives a hint of what her performance was like. (The unknown dancer in the film is often mistakenly identified as Fuller herself; however, there is no actual film footage of Fuller dancing.)

Fuller's pioneering work attracted the attention, respect, and friendship of many French artists and scientists, including Jules Chéret, Henri de Toulouse-Lautrec, François-Raoul Larche, Henri-Pierre Roché, Auguste Rodin, Jean-Léon Gérôme, Franz von Stuck, Maurice Denis, Thomas Theodor Heine, Paul-Léon Jazet, Koloman Moser, Demétre Chiparus, Stéphane Mallarmé, and Marie Curie. Fuller was also a member of the Société astronomique de France (French Astronomical Society).

Fuller held many patents related to stage lighting including chemical compounds for creating color gel and the use of chemical salts for luminescent lighting and garments (stage costumes US Patent 518347). She attempted to create a patent of her Serpentine Dance as she hoped to stop imitators from taking her choreography and even claiming to be her. Fuller submitted a written description of her dance to the United States Copyright Office; however, a US Circuit Court judge ended up denying Fuller's request for an injunction, as the Serpentine Dance told no story and was therefore not eligible for copyright protection.  At that time dance was only protected if it qualified as "dramatic" and Fuller's dance was too abstract for this qualification. The precedent set by Fuller's case remained in place from 1892 until 1976, when Federal Copyright Law explicitly extended protection to choreographic works.

One notorious imitator was Lord Yarmouth, later 7th Marquess of Hertford, who performed the Serpentine Dance in England and the colonies under the stage name of ‘Mademoiselle Roze’. Fuller supported other pioneering performers, such as fellow United States-born dancer Isadora Duncan. Fuller helped Duncan ignite her European career in 1902 by sponsoring independent concerts in Vienna and Budapest.

Loie Fuller's original stage name was "Louie". In modern French "L'ouïe" is the word for a sense of hearing. When Fuller reached Paris she gained a nickname which was a pun on "Louie"/"L'ouïe". She was renamed "Loïe" - this nickname is a corruption of the early or Medieval French "L'oïe", a precursor to "L'ouïe", which means "receptiveness" or "understanding". She was also referred to by the nickname "Lo Lo Fuller".

Fuller formed a close friendship with Queen Marie of Romania; their extensive correspondence has been published. Fuller, through a connection at the United States embassy in Paris played a role in arranging a United States loan for Romania during World War I. Later, during the period when the future Carol II of Romania was alienated from the Romanian royal family and living in Paris with his mistress Magda Lupescu, she befriended them; they were unaware of her connection to Carol's mother Marie. Fuller initially advocated to Marie on behalf of the couple, but later schemed unsuccessfully with Marie to separate Carol from Lupescu. With Queen Marie and American businessman Samuel Hill, Fuller helped found the Maryhill Museum of Art in rural Washington state, which has permanent exhibits about her career.

Fuller occasionally returned to America to stage performances by her students, the "Fullerets" or Muses, but spent the end of her life in Paris. She died of pneumonia at the age of 65 on January 1, 1928, in Paris, two weeks shy of her 66th birthday. She was cremated and buried in the columbarium of the Père-Lachaise cemetery (site No. 5382) in Paris.

Continuing influence

After Fuller's death, her romantic partner of thirty years, Gab Sorère inherited the dance troupe as well as the laboratory Fuller had operated. Sorère took legal action against dancers who wrongfully used Fuller's fame to enhance their own careers and produced both films and theatrical productions to honor Fuller's legacy as a visual effects artist.

Fuller's work has been experiencing a resurgence of professional and public interest.  Rhonda K. Garelick's 2009 study entitled Electric Salome demonstrates her centrality not only to dance, but also modernist performance. Sally R. Sommer has written extensively about Fuller's life and times  Marcia and Richard Current published a biography entitled Loie Fuller, Goddess of Light in 1997. The philosopher Jacques Rancière devoted a chapter of Aisthesis, his history of modern aesthetics, to Fuller's 1893 performances in Paris, which he considers emblematic of Art Nouveau in their attempt to link artistic and technological invention. And Giovanni Lista compiled a 680-page book of Fuller-inspired art work and texts in Loïe Fuller, Danseuse de la Belle Epoque in 1994. In the 1980s, Munich dancer Brygida Ochaim revived Fuller's dances and techniques, also appearing in the Claude Chabrol film The Swindler.

In 2016, Stéphanie Di Giusto directed the movie The Dancer about the life of Loïe Fuller, with actresses Soko as Loïe and Lily-Rose Depp as Isadora Duncan. Jody Sperling choreographed Soko's dances for the movie, served as creative consultant and was Soko's dance coach, training her in Fuller technique. The movie premiered at the 2016 Cannes Film Festival.

Fuller continues to be an influence on contemporary choreographers. Sperling, who re-imagines Fuller's genre from a contemporary perspective, has choreographed dozens of works inspired by Fuller and expanded Fuller's vocabulary and technique into the 21st century. Sperling's company Time Lapse Dance consists of six dancers all versed in Fuller-style technique and performance. Another is Ann Cooper Albright, who collaborated with a lighting designer on a series of works that drew inspiration from Fuller’s original lighting design patents.  Shela Xoregos choreographed a tribute, La Loȉe, a solo which shows several of Fuller's special effects.

Taylor Swift's 2018 Reputation Tour featured a segment dedicated to Fuller. During her performance of "Dress" each night on the tour, several dancers recreated the "Serpentine Dance." In the reputation Stadium Tour concert film on Netflix, after “Dress” there is a message showing Taylor’s dedication to Fuller.

Into the 2019 film Radioactive Loie Fuller (Drew Jacoby) is a friend of the main character Marie Curie.
The scientist envisions Fuller dancing in the green light of radium. The dancer also introduces the Curies to a medium.

Written works
Fuller's autobiographical memoir Quinze ans de ma vie was written in English, translated into French by Bojidar Karageorgevitch and published by F. Juven (Paris) in 1908 with an introduction by Anatole France. She drafted her memoirs again in English a few years later, which were published under the title Fifteen Years of a Dancer's Life by H. Jenkins (London) in 1913. The New York Public Library Jerome Robbins Dance Collection holds the nearly complete manuscript to the English edition and materials related to the French edition. Although her book is a first hand account, she was also known for being very adaptive in her story telling. There are seven highly dramatized versions of how she got her first silk skirt; however, the real story is unknown. As well as writing about inventing the Serpentine Dance, she also wrote extensively about her own theories of modern dance and motion.

See also
List of dancers
Women in dance

References

External links

Dance Heritage Coalition – 100 Dance Treasures – Loie Fuller capsule biography and essay by Jody Sperling
"Chapter One: Loie Fuller, Goddess of Light", New York Times.
Biodata
Biography
 Loie Fuller collection, 1914–1928, held by the Jerome Robbins Dance Division, New York Public Library for the Performing Arts
 Loie Fuller papers, 1892–1913, held by the Jerome Robbins Dance Division, New York Public Library for the Performing Arts
 Loie Fuller notebooks and letters, held by the Jerome Robbins Dance Division, New York Public Library for the Performing Arts

Actresses from Illinois
American female dancers
American dancers
American artists' models
American patent holders
Burials at Père Lachaise Cemetery
Deaths from pneumonia in France
American lighting designers
Modern dancers
Vaudeville performers
1862 births
1928 deaths
People from Hinsdale, Illinois
LGBT people from Illinois
LGBT choreographers
Articles containing video clips
American lesbian artists